The Benedictine College Ravens are the athletic teams that represent Benedictine College, located in Atchison, Kansas, in intercollegiate sports as a member of the National Association of Intercollegiate Athletics (NAIA), primarily competing in the Heart of America Athletic Conference (HAAC) since the 1991–92 academic year. The Ravens previously competed as an NAIA Independent from 1962–63 to 1990–91; in the Central Intercollegiate Athletic Conference (CIC) from 1937–38 to 1961–62; as an Independent from January 1929 (during the 1928–29 school year) to 1936–37; and in the Kansas Collegiate Athletic Conference (KCAC) from 1902–03 to 1927–28.

The men's college was known as St. Benedict's College (alongside sister institution Mount St. Scholastica College) until a merger in 1971 created co-ed Benedictine College.

Benedictine won NAIA titles in men's basketball (1954, 1967) and women's lacrosse (2022). The Ravens played in the first NAIA basketball tournament in 1937 and the first football playoffs in 1958.

Varsity teams
Benedictine competes in 20 intercollegiate varsity sports: Men's sports include baseball, basketball, cross country, football, lacrosse, soccer, track & field (indoor and outdoor) and wrestling; while women's sports include basketball, cross country, lacrosse, soccer, softball, track & field (indoor and outdoor) and volleyball; and co-ed sports include cheerleading, dance and spirit squad.

NAIA basketball champions
The Ravens won the NAIA Tournament in Kansas City in 1954 and 1967, both under NAIA Hall of Fame coach Ralph Nolan.

The two champions took decidedly different routes to the title. The 1954 Ravens were regarded as underdogs throughout their run. The field included two-time defending champion Southwest Missouri State and East Texas State, the third-place finisher in 1953.

The 1967 Ravens came to Kansas City as the top seed.

In 1954, St. Benedict's College defeated Western Illinois 62-56 in the title game.

In 1967, the Ravens entered the tournament as the No. 1 seed.  St. Benedict's won its second title with a 71–65 victory over Oklahoma Baptist.

The 1967 Ravens are one of six teams to finish the season No. 1 in the coaches poll, enter the tournament as the top seed and win the title.

In 2020, The Kansas City Star named Darryl Jones, a star of the 1967 team, and Nolan NAIA Tournament team.

Benedictine has made 12 appearances in the NAIA Tournament, most recently in 2021.

The Ravens qualified for the NAIA in 2014, 2015, 2017, 2019 and 2021 under coach Ryan Moody.

St. Benedict's played in the first NAIA Tournament in 1937 as one of eight teams in the field in Kansas City. The Ravens also qualified in 1953, 1958, 1965 and 1970. The 1965 Ravens advanced to the final eight of the 32-team field.

St. Benedict's also won Central Intercollegiate Conference titles in 1953, 1954 and 1958.

In 2014, Benedictine made its first appearance since 1970 and won its opening game over Westminster (70–65).

Football's rise, fall and return

The story of football at Benedictine College is written by coach Larry Wilcox, who played for the Ravens and took over as coach at age 28. He coached for 42 seasons before retiring in 2020. Along the way, he played a major role in the college's financial health and enrollment, built a football stadium, offices and weight room, won 300-plus games and mentored many lives.

He also has his own bobblehead.

Wilcox and his long-time assistants, for generations of football players, are as much a part of the Benedictine experience as the Abbey, the Raven Walk, the Raven fight song and homecoming bed races.

While Wilcox, as a player, coach and athletic director, built the current edition of Ravens football, he isn't the only successful part of football at the college.

The Ravens own 16 NAIA playoff appearances, including a runner-up finish in 2018 and trips to the semifinals in 1992 and 2001. They made eight appearances in nine seasons between 1995 and 2003.

As St. Benedict's, the Ravens made their first appearance in 1958 as one of four NAIA playoff teams.

The 2018 Ravens went 13–2 to set a school record for season victories. They won the Heart of America Athletic Conference North Division title. In the NAIA playoffs, they defeated Cumberlands (48–41), Concordia (54–38) and Kansas Wesleyan (43–21) to advance to the NAIA title game. Top-ranked Morningside defeated Benedictine 35–28 in Daytona Beach, Fla.

More than 3,000 Benedictine fans traveled to the game.

St. Benedict's started football in 1920 and the program enjoyed several high points in its early years. The school dropped football after the 1962 season. Varsity football returned in 1973.

Wilcox came to St. Benedict's in 1969 and joined the football club upon its revival in 1970 on its way to varsity status.

Wilcox, after serving as assistant coach, took over the program in 1979 and presided over its transformation into a consistent winner and regular NAIA playoff qualifier. The Ravens play in Larry Wilcox Stadium, opened in 1998, on campus. In 1990, the Ravens moved into the Amino Center locker room, offices and weight room. Benedictine expanded the facility in 2004 and 2007.

Wilcox, a 1972 graduate, was inducted into the NAIA Hall of Fame in 2017. He coached the Ravens to 14 of their 15 NAIA playoff appearances.

 
 
In 2004, Wilcox donated his salary to help complete expansion of the Amino Center.

St. Benedict's played in its first bowl game in 1956 under coach Ivan Schottel. The Ravens defeated Northeastern Oklahoma State 14–13 in the Mineral Water Bowl in Excelsior Springs, Mo. Since resuming football, the Ravens won the 1976 Boot Hill Bowl and the 1991 Steamboat Bowl. They lost in the 1977 Boot Hill Bowl and the 1986 Sunflower Bowl.

St. Benedict's won its first conference title in 1940 under coach Marty Peters. The Ravens went 4–0 in the Central Intercollegiate Conference with wins over Fort Hays State, Pittsburg State, Southwestern and Emporia State. Schottel became coach in 1953 and won or shared CIC titles in 1953, 1956, 1958, 1959 and 1960.

The 1958 Ravens went 10–1 and rose to No. 5 in the NAIA rankings before losing to Northeastern Oklahoma in the NAIA Western Playoff. The Ravens won the CIC title and grabbed 10 of the 11 spots on the first-team all-conference team. Quarterback Mark Flynn was named CIC Back of the Year and George Worley was the CIC Lineman of the Year. Worley was also named NAIA Lineman of the Year.

St. Benedict's also enjoyed a notable run of success in the 1930s under coach Moon Mullins. He coached five seasons and went 37–5-1, capped by an 8–0 season in 1936.

Benedictine played as an independent after resuming football in 1973. It rekindled CIC rivalries against schools such as Washburn and Emporia State at times, and also regularly played Missouri Western. After years of lobbying (and a short run in the Tri-State Conference), Benedictine joined the Heart of America in 1992 and shared the conference title with Baker.

The Ravens went 9–0 in the Heart in 1995 to win its second title. It also won Heart titles in 1997, 1998, 2000 and 2013. It claimed Heart North Division titles in 2017 and 2018.

"A strangle hold on the honor and glory that goes with crushing Rockhurst"

For 60-plus years, the Ravens and Rockhurst College faced off in a rivalry as intense as any in small-college athletics. The Catholic colleges are separated by 56 miles and their meetings, especially in basketball, defined seasons and packed gymnasiums for decades.

Fans rode trains to Kansas City for games and students dribbled a basketball from the Atchison campus to Kansas City in a show of spirit. In the 1960s and 1970s, the meetings in Kansas City often drew crowds of 5-10,000 to Municipal Auditorium. In Atchison, the gym would be packed with 3,000 fans at 1:30 for a 3 p.m. game. "Rockhurst Weekend" became the social and party event of the school year in Atchison, regardless of the outcome of the game. It traditionally started with beer and Wheaties breakfast at The Wharf and included a rivalry t-shirt mocking the Hawks before an afternoon game.

Students stole NAIA championship banners from each campus, lobbed stink bombs into open dorm windows and distributed leaflets with insults - Rockhurst mocked St. Benedict's students as "Hayseeds."  Rockhurst students enjoyed visiting Atchison to rearrange a rock formation spelling "St. Benedict's" by changing the "B" to "R" and painting it blue. Several times, Rockhurst fans attempted to invade the Snakepit seating area in the Benedictine gym and had to be forcibly removed. Benedictine students planned for weeks a strategy to sneak chickens, sometimes painted blue, into the game. Hanging insulting banners from the rafters was another popular prank.

In 1970, St. Benedict's students celebrated a seven-game basketball win streak over the Hawks by taking out an advertisement in the Kansas City Times. The copy recounted St. Benedict's two NAIA titles and taunted "The Raven Sports Arena Awaits You Hawks."

In 1990, Benedictine students kidnapped the Hawks mascot costume, performed during a soccer game and returned to Atchison with the prize.

While basketball grabbed most of the attention, football and soccer games also fueled the rivalry.

The Ravens dominated the football series by winning 16 of the 23 meetings between 1921-1949. Rockhurst dropped the sport in 1949. St. Benedict's won the first meeting 35-0 and shut out the Hawks six times. The Ravens won 12 straight meetings from 1932-1946 and won the final meeting 27-13 in 1949.

In 1936, The Kansas City Times reported a crowd of 5,000 watched a 32-6 win by St. Benedict's in Kansas City. "The Ravens, on the loose all season, flew up and down Bourke field yesterday and in fewer than twenty minutes after the start had a strangle hold on the honor and glory that goes with crushing Rockhurst college's Hawks, their traditional rivals."

In soccer, Rockhurst dominated the Missouri NAIA district as the Ravens did Kansas. The Hawks regularly tormented Benedictine by knocking it out of NAIA Tournament contention in the Area Playoffs. The Ravens defeated Rockhurst in 1974 and 1983 to advance to the national tournament.

The basketball series peaked in the 1960s, when Rockhurst won the NAIA title in 1964 and the Ravens in 1967. St. Benedict's, which also won in 1954 and returned to the NAIA in 1958, advanced to Kansas City in 1965 and 1970. Rockhurst qualified in 1963, 1966 and 1967.

Rockhurst won the first meeting 36-33 in 1921, and four of the first five. In 1935, the Ravens started a streak of six wins and 12 in 13 meetings. The Ravens won 16 straight from 1946-54. A 10-game win streak carried the Ravens from 1966-1971. Rockhurst dominated the 1980s by winning 20 in a row. Late in the 1980s, Benedictine's program improved under coaches Del Morley and Mike Sickafoose and the rivalry became competitive again.

The series started to fade in the mid-1990s. Benedictine joined the Heart of America Athletic Conference in 1992, which made playing Rockhurst twice on its traditional Saturday spots impossible because of conference scheduling requirements. In 1998, Rockhurst joined NCAA Division II. The teams played occasionally in recent seasons, sometimes as an exhibition game.

Highlights of the basketball rivalry with Rockhurst

1939-40

Ravens 50, Hawks 18 in Atchison – The Ravens handed Rockhurst the “worst basketball licking” of the series. Jack Andrews and Ed Farrell both scored eight points for St. Benedict’s. Farrell “plunked in three extra long swishers in succession.”

1946-47

Ravens 45, Hawks 43 in Atchison – “St. Benedict’s college defeated Rockhurst college, 45 to 43, last night in one of those all-out traditional battles for which the ancient foes are famous. Fans occupied every available seat and almost all of the standing room in the big Raven gymnasium to see the rivals fight it out.”

1957-58

Ravens 69, Hawks 50 in Kansas City – St. Benedict’s ended a six-game losing streak in the series with a win at Mason-Halpin Fieldhouse. Bob Veale, who would later pitch for the Pittsburgh Pirates, scored 22 points for the Ravens.

1964-65

Ravens 85, Hawks 83 at Municipal Auditorium – Darryl Jones scored 25 points, 18 in the first half, to help St. Benedict’s defeat the reigning NAIA champions.

1966-67

Ravens 92, Hawks 90 at Municipal Auditorium – Darryl Jones’ steal and dunk gave St. Benedict’s a 90-88 lead and Hawks coach Dolor Rehm had to be restrained from going after the officials. A steal by Vince DeGreeff led to clinching free throws for the Ravens. DeGreeff scored 31 points to help St. Benedict’s improve to 17-2 on their way to the NAIA title.

1968-69

Ravens 75, Hawks 69 in Atchison – Tim Moore scored 27 points to give St. Benedict's its sixth straight win over Rockhurst.

1970-71

Ravens 87, Hawks 85 in Atchison – Jay Williams followed in a missed shot by Chic Downing in the final seconds. Downing scored 21 points and Williams added 14 and 13 rebounds.
 
1971-72

Ravens 83, Hawks 80 in Kansas City – Chic Downing scored 21 points and Jackie Lee added 17 for the Ravens, who avenged a 60-58 overtime defeat earlier in the season. A crowd of 5,400 watched.

1987-88

Ravens 96, Hawks 76 in Kansas City – Benedictine snapped a 20-game losing streak in the series with Tony Russo scoring 22 points. Tony Tanking made four three-pointers to score 19 points and the Ravens defeated the Hawks for the first time since 1978.

1989-90

Ravens 78, Hawks 74 in Atchison – Pat Giller scored 29 points and the Ravens rallied from an 11-point deficit in the second half.

1991-92

Ravens 82, Hawks 74 in Kansas City – Technical fouls and a potential scuffle in the final seconds highlighted Benedictine’s win. Jason Wyrick scored 22 points for the Ravens

1992-93

Ravens 120, Hawks 113 (three overtimes) in Atchison – Rockhurst led 79-77 in the closing seconds of regulation, 92-89 in the final seconds of the first overtime and 103-101 late in the second overtime. Benedictine’s Jason Wyrick, fouled on a desperation shot with no time remaining, made three foul shots to tie it 92-all and force the second overtime. Wyrick, again fouled on a three-point shot, made two foul shots to give the Ravens a 112-107 lead in the final overtime. Matt Westerhaus led the Ravens with 33 points. Albert Karner added 19 points – all from the line – with 17 assists and 12 rebounds.

1993-94

Ravens 82, Hawks 74 in Atchison – Current Benedictine coach Ryan Moody scored 29 points.

NAIA basketball All-Americans
Darryl Jones, a 6-foot-5 forward, and Chic Downing, a 6-foot-7 center, are the lone Ravens to earn first-team NAIA All-American honors.

Jones, from St. Louis, is the school's most-decorated basketball player. He was named NAIA All-American four times - third team in 1965 and 1966 and first in 1967 and 1968. He scored 2,014 points to rank second on the career list. He owns the program's career rebounding mark with 1,471, highlighted by an average of 15.1 a game in 1967.

Downing, from Atchison, earned first-team honors in 1972 and third team in 1970.  Downing is the program's career scoring leader with 2,042 points and rank second with 1,158 rebounds. He averaged a program-best 25.5 points in 1971-72, as well as 13.4 rebounds. The New York Knicks selected Downing in the 11th round of the 1972 NBA Draft.

Downing, 72, died on Feb. 22, 2020 in Atchison.  He won four state titles as coach at Atchison High School, as well as two as a player for the Redmen. He was an All-State selection in 1968 before attending St. Benedict's. He was named KBCA Coach of the Year in 1985 and 1988.

Ravens win 31 games, 24-0 in conference play in 2018-19
Benedictine featured great chemistry, three-point shooting and strong defense in 2018-19 and it resulted in a remarkable season. Its 24-0 record in the Heart of America Athletic Conference play is believed to be a collegiate record for most wins in an unbeaten conference season.

The Ravens held opponents to 38.7 percent shooting to rank third nationally, second with 159 blocks, and held opponents to 67 points a game. They made 39.6 percent of their three-pointers, seventh nationally.

The 2018-19 Ravens entered the NAIA tournament with a 30–3 record.   They defeated Westmont (90–85) before falling to Pikeville 83–79 in double overtime.

The Ravens finished 31-4. They won a school-record 29 games in a row and moved to No. 1 in the NAIA national poll.

Benedictine won 26 straight games against Heart schools before losing to No. 24 Peru State in the championship of the conference tournament. It defeated seven ranked Heart opponents during the regular season, highlighted by an 84-70 home win over No. 2 William Penn.

Senior guard Thomas O'Connor and center Adam Kutney earned second-team NAIA All-American honors and all-conference honors. Moody was named the NABC-NAIA Division I Men’s Basketball Coach of the Year and the Heart's Coach of the Year.

Guard Jaiden Bristol and forward Eric Krus were named to the all-conference second team, with Krus also named Freshman of the Year. Forward Colby Nickels earned honorable mention all-conference honors.

Moody's 2013-14 team returned the Ravens to the NAIA Tournament after years of irrelevance. The gap from 1970 to 2014 included only 12 winning seasons.

The Ravens won their first Heart of America Athletic Conference title that season. No. 9 Benedictine clinched the title with a 68-65 win over No. 19 Evangel at home to finish 14-4 in the conference. Benedictine finished the season 23-9.

The Ravens started the season 10-1 and that stretch included wins over the top two teams in the NAIA rankings. Benedictine won at No. 2 Oklahoma Baptist 69-64 to improve to 5-1. At home, the 13th-ranked Ravens routed No. 1 Columbia (Mo.) College 73-59 behind Charlie Wallrap's 21 points and 11 rebounds. Benedictine also won at No. 5 Evangel, 85-82, on its way to the conference title.

In 2020-21, the Ravens went 21-7 and returned to the NAIA Tournament in its new 48-team field. In Opening Round play in Wichita, Benedictine defeated Central Baptist College 71-63. No. 24 University of St. Francis defeated Benedictine 73-65 in the second round to advance to Kansas City as one of 16 teams.

The Ravens went 15-4 in conference play to finish as the second seed and first in the South Division. They finished No. 22 in the final national poll.

1949 Ravens upset Siena, Dayton at NCIT
In 1948-49, St. Benedict's accepted a spot in the first National Catholic Invitational Tournament in Denver, as part of a 16-team field. The Ravens, coached by Robert Walsh, entered the tournament with an 8-13 record. They upset top-seeded Siena, which had a 22-6 record, in the opening game 61-46. St. Benedict's defeated Dayton 59-55 in the quarterfinals.

St. Francis (N.Y.) handled the Ravens 69-40 in the semifinals. St. Benedict's finished fourth after a 71-70 loss to Loyola of Baltimore in the third-place game. Ken Werba of St. Benedict's was named to the all-tournament team. He scored 19 points in the win over Siena, headlined "Unheralded Kansas Team Knocks Siena Out of Catholic Cage Tourney" in a New York newspaper.

Host Regis College won the title after finishing as the 1949 NAIA Tournament runner-up earlier that month.

The NCIT lasted for four years. In 1949, the NCAA Tournament invited eight teams and 12 went to the NIT. The NCIT was designed for Catholic colleges without a conference affiliation.

Larry Wilcox wins No. 300, later retires after 42 seasons
Wilcox announced his retirement in November 2020 after 42 seasons as coach at Benedictine. He  finished his career with a record of 304-154 after a 19-6 loss to Baker in the final game of the fall season. 

Due to the COVID-19 pandemic, the NAIA moved its playoffs to the spring. The Ravens, with an 8-2 record, did not earn an at-large bid to the playoffs. Joel Osborn, who replaced Wilcox in January 2021, coached the Ravens in a 48-0 win over Hastings in April, their final game of the 2020 season.

On October 10, 2020, Wilcox added another landmark to his resume.  The Ravens defeated Peru State 31-27 in Atchison to give Wilcox career win No. 300. According to Benedictine College, he is the 14th coach to win 300 games at a four-year school and the seventh to win all at the same school.

No football coach at a Kansas four-year college has won more games.

Joel Osborn wins first Heart title, returns BC to NAIA playoffs
Benedictine replaced Wilcox with Joel Osborn, an assistant coach and former quarterback at Northwest Missouri State, on Jan. 14, 2021.

After a 7-4 debut season in 2021, Osborn coached the Ravens to a 10-1 regular-season record in 2022. Benedictine won the Heart South Division title with a 5-0 record and earned an automatic bid to the NAIA playoffs. The Ravens defeated Southwestern 35-7 at Wilcox Stadium in the opening round. BC gave away five turnovers in the quarterfinal and lost 24-13 at Indiana Wesleyan to end the season 11-2.

Osborn worked as co-offensive coordinator in 2018 and 2019 for Northwest Missouri State. He also served as running back and receivers coach. Northwest averaged 41.9 points in 2019 and 36.6 points in 2018.

Osborn's hiring means that every football season since 1950 has been coached by either an alum of Northwest Missouri State or St. Benedict's/Benedictine. Schottel is a graduate of Northwest Missouri State and coached the Ravens from 1953-62. All other coaches since 1950 (when Leo Deutsch took over) were alums of SBC/BC.

Osborn, from Harlan, Iowa, went 16-3 as starting quarterback at Northwest and started two NCAA Division II title games (losses to Valdosta State and Minnesota-Duluth). He was named 2008 MIAA Offensive Player of the Year.

Osborn won his first game under unusual circumstances. No. 18 Benedictine routed Hastings College 48-0 on April 10 at Wilcox Stadium. With the NAIA playoffs delayed until the spring because of the pandemic, Benedictine scheduled a game the day before the selection to improve their resume. The Ravens piled up 494 yards of offense in Osborn's debut, following 20 practices and a scrimmage with Doane University.

Benedictine finished the 2020 season ranked No. 16 in the NAIA poll with an 8-2 record. It was not selected for the 16-team NAIA playoff field.

The Ravens went 7-4 in 2021 under Osborn. They started the season ranked No. 17 before a 1-2 start knocked them out of the poll. Benedictine finished the season with a 70-58 win over MidAmerica Nazarene. Quarterback Garrett Kettle set a school record with six touchdown passes. He completed 17 of 33 passes for 358 yards and scoring passes of 34, 74, 13, 36, 53 and seven yards. Temple also ran for 72 yards and a touchdown.

The Ravens surrendered 659 passing yards to Pioneers quarterback Adrian Parsons, who completed 33 of 54 passes and recorded four touchdowns.

Ravens win NAIA lacrosse championship in 2022
Benedictine College won the 2022 NAIA title in women's lacrosse with a 9-8 victory over top-seeded Lawrence Tech. The fifth-ranked Ravens (16-1) defeated Cumberlands 14-11 in the NAIA quarterfinals and Savannah College of Art and Design 15-14 in the semifinal.

In the championship game, Erica Odell scored four goals. Clare Ryan's goal with 4:08 to play gave the Ravens the win.

Clare Hanson, a former Benedictine player and assistant coach, coached the Ravens to the national title in her first season as head coach. Odell was named Championship MVP.

Benedictine also qualified for the 2021 NAIA Tournament, where it lost to Lawrence Tech 20-11 in the quarterfinal. Benedictine's Natalie Wechter earned Player of the Year honors in 2021.

BC added men's and women's lacrosse in 2016 and both program excelled immediately.

The women's team won six straight KCAC regular-season titles and five tournament titles. The Ravens competed in the NAIA National Invitational Tournament in 2018 and 2019 before the NAIA adopted lacrosse as a championship sport.

The men's team won the KCAC title in 2019 and tournament titles in 2019 and 2022. It played in the NAIA Invitational in 2019, 2021 and 2022.

Benedictine will move its lacrosse programs to the Heart of America Conference in 2023. The conference added the sport in 2022.

Football All-Americans, all-conference selections from 1936-present
Running back Don Brown and center Truman Ashby are Benedictine football players named first-team NAIA All-American twice. Brown gained 4,490 yards and scored 50 touchdowns in his career.

Other two-time All-Americans include defensive back/returner Shem Johnson (second team in 1997, 1998), returner and receiver Cory Schrick (first team 1999, second 2000) and offensive lineman Garrett Bader (second team 2017, first team 2018). Bader is one of three Ravens to win the Rimington Award as the NAIA's top center. He earned the honor in 2018 to join Ashby (2007) and David Stochlin (2014).

Women's basketball grows into consistent winner

Benedictine College started varsity women’s basketball in 1973-74 and the program muddled its way to two winning seasons over the next 21 seasons.

Then Benedictine found the right two coaches, both of whom made the Ravens consistent winners.

In 1994, Benedictine hired Steve Huber, an assistant coach at Bradley University and a man with a passion for recruiting. Huber changed the program quickly and its success continued under current coach Chad Folsom, an Atchison native who played at Maur Hill Prep.

Huber’s first team went 11-20, followed by 16-15. In 1996-97, the Ravens went 25-6 to start a string of three 25-win seasons under Huber. The Ravens won Heart of America Conference titles in 1998 and 1999 and advanced to the NAIA Division II national tournament in 1997, 1998 and 1999.

In 1998, eighth-seeded Benedictine won its first national tournament game, 68-47 over Illinois-Springfield. The 1999 Ravens made 42.6 percent of their three-point shots to lead NAIA Division II for the second time under Huber.

Huber left Benedictine after the 1998-99 season to continue a career that included stops as an assistant at Central Missouri, Louisville, San Diego State and Creighton and the head coaching job at Drury.

In 2001, Chad Folsom left his job as men’s coach at Lamar (Colo.) Community College to come to Benedictine. He guided the Ravens to a 22-10 record in his third season (2003–04).

In 2005-06, the Ravens went 30-5 to set a program record for wins and won the conference title. They advanced to the NAIA Division II Elite Eight. BC entered the national tournament seeded second and defeated Daeman 73-60 and Doane 56-55 before losing to College of the Ozarks 73-64 in double overtime in the quarterfinals.

In 2007-08, Benedictine won another conference title and returned to the national tournament as the No. 3 seed. It defeated Aquinas 79-57 in the opener before losing to Hastings 70-62 to finish 29-6.

In 2009, the Heart moved to NAIA Division I. Benedictine qualified for the national tournament in 2013, 2015, 2016, 2017 and 2018.

In 2016, the Ravens advanced to the NAIA Final Four before losing to conference rival Baker 50-34 in the semifinals.

Football rivalries with Pittsburg State, William Jewell and Baker

Those three schools, in different eras, often marked pivotal dates on the schedule. Pittsburg State was an NAIA power in the 1950s, often battling with St. Benedict's for the CIC crown. Jewell also enjoyed great success in that time as a member of the MCAU and the schools often met in the regular-season finale.

Baker and Benedictine heated up as rivals in 1992 when the Ravens joined the Heart of America Conference. While Benedictine no longer plays Pitt State and Jewell (both are NCAA Division II schools), the series with Baker continues as a high point on the schedule.

In the 1950s, games against Pittsburg State often decided the CIC title. From 1955–61, the Ravens and Gorillas combined to win all seven championships. In 1953, the Ravens shared the CIC crown with Washburn. A year later, Fort Hays State won the title to interrupt the SBC/Pitt State dominance.

In 1957, Pitt State handed the Ravens their lone loss (17–13 in Pittsburg), and the Gorillas went 11–0 to win the NAIA title. In 1958, St. Benedict's defeated the Gorillas 26-19 on its way to the NAIA playoffs. In 1959, St. Benedict's won 13–12, Pitt State's lone CIC loss. In 1960, the Ravens won again (41-19) to hand the Gorillas their lone defeat in an 8-1 season.

The Ravens did not lose a CIC game in 1958, 1959 and 1960.

William Jewell, which won seven MCAU titles from 1950 to 1960 also served as an important rival during those days. The 1958 Ravens completed an unbeaten regular season and clinched the NAIA playoff spot with a 21–20 win over Jewell. A year later, the Ravens again won the season finale over the Cardinals (25–21) to ruin Jewell's run at an unbeaten season. Again in 1960, the Ravens handed Jewell its lone defeat in the season finale, this time 34–13.

BC's move to the Heart in 1992 helped scheduling and added importance to rivalry games against Jewell and Baker.

The Ravens shared the Heart title in its first year as a member, going 7–1 in the Heart and 11-2 overall. It avenged a regular-season loss to Baker with a 21–14 win in the NAIA playoff quarterfinals at Amelia Earhart Stadium in Atchison.

The rivalry with William Jewell returned to prominence in the 1980s. The Cardinals dominated the Heart early in the decade and made NAIA playoff appearances in 1980, 1981, 1982 and 1983. They finished as NAIA runner-up in 1982.

In 1985, Jewell won the Heart title and played host to the unbeaten Ravens in the regular-season finale. Benedictine won 35–17 to improve to 10–0 and wrap up its first NAIA berth since 1958. The win snapped a five-game losing streak to Jewell and signaled a shift in the series. Benedictine went 19–6 against Jewell since that 1985 game until 2010, when Jewell left the Heart. The series ended with three straight wins by the Ravens by scores of 47–3, 24–7 and 21–0.

The rivalry with Baker continues.

Like Jewell, Baker was an NAIA power in the early 1980s and presented an obstacle as Benedictine built its program. Either Baker or Jewell (or both) won 12 of 13 Heart of America titles from 1979 to 1991. While Jewell played BC regularly, Baker and Benedictine did not become consistent opponents until the Ravens joined the Heart.

The series with Baker hit a high point early with the two meetings in 1992.

Conference affiliations

St. Benedict's College joined the Central Intercollegiate Conference in 1938.  It left the CIC in 1963 after dropping football in 1962. The CIC existed from 1928-68 with members such as Pittsburg State, Fort Hays State, Emporia, Omaha and Washburn.

The basketball team continued to play a round robin schedule against its former CIC rivals into the 1980s.

From 1902 to 1928, St. Benedict's was a member of the Kansas College Athletic Conference. In 1933, according to a Kansas City Star report, St. Benedict's and Rockhurst were informally considered for membership in the MIAA (then known as the Missouri Intercollegiate Athletic Association).

In 1988, Benedictine joined the four-team Tri-State Conference, a football-only affiliation that lasted three seasons.

For most of the 1960s, 1970s and 1980s, the Ravens competed as an independent in NAIA District 10, which provided post-season competition and individual honors.

In 1992, Benedictine joined the Heart of America Athletic Conference for all sports, a group that the school had long targeted for its geographic and institutional fit.

Moon Mullins starts a connection with Notre Dame
St. Benedict's College leaned on Notre Dame for several of its early athletic leaders.

In 1932, the college hired Larry "Moon" Mullins as football and basketball coach and athletic director. Mullins played fullback on two national champions under coach Knute Rockne with the Irish.

Mullins quickly turned those teams into winners. He went 37-5-1 in five seasons as football coach, with the University of Kansas responsible for two of those losses. Mullins finished his time in Atchison with strong seasons in both sports. The football team finished with an 8-0 record in 1936. The 1936-37 basketball team went 17-3 and played in the first NAIA Tournament.

Marty Peters, a football and basketball player at Notre Dame, replaced Mullins. Robert Walsh, who played offensive guard at Notre Dame, coached St. Benedict's in 1948 and 1949.

Mullins' influence continued in 1950 when St. Benedict's hired Leo Deutsch as football coach. Deustch played for Mullins at St. Benedict's and earned Associated Press Little All-America honors in 1936 at end. He served as Mullins' assistant coach at St. Ambrose (Iowa) before returning to Atchison to coach.

Sports

Men's sports
 Baseball
 Basketball
 Cross country
 Football
 Soccer
 Field Lacrosse
 Track and Field
 Wrestling

Women's sports
 Basketball
 Cheerleading
 Cross country
 Dance Team
 Soccer
 Softball
 Track and Field
 Volleyball
 Women's Lacrosse

Facilities
 The Ballpark at Benedictine: Baseball
 BC Softball Field: Softball
 The Haverty Center: Practice facilities, Cheer offices
 John Casey Soccer Center: Soccer, Lacrosse
 Laughlin Track at Larry Wilcox Stadium: Track and Field
 Mother Teresa Center: Athletic Training Facility
 O'Malley Field at Larry Wilcox Stadium: Football
 Ralph Nolan Gymnasium: Basketball and Volleyball

Mascot
 
The mascot "Rocky" is associated with St. Benedict, as legend has it a raven would bring the sixth-century saint food during his time as a hermit in the mountains near Subiaco, Italy.  The legend also has the raven saving St. Benedict from eating poisoned bread.

Notable alumni

 Irv Comp, starting quarterback of the Green Bay Packers, member of the 1944 NFL Championship team
 Kyle Greig, professional soccer player having played in Major League Soccer and the United Soccer League, played at Benedictine from 2008 through 2011
 Terry Hanson, athlete and coach in Ravens Hall of Fame who went on to a successful career in pro sports and the media
 Darryl Jones, athlete led 1967 basketball team to NAIA  National Championship, NAIA All-American and All-Decade team selection. drafted by NBA's San Diego Rockets prior their move to Houston
 Jamie Mueller, professional running back for the Buffalo Bills (1987–1990)
 Chris Tabor, Special teams coordinator for the Cleveland Browns (2011–2017) and the Chicago Bears (2018–present)

References

External links